The Camphill Movement is an initiative for social change based on the principles of anthroposophy. Camphill communities are residential communities and schools that provide support for the education, employment, and daily lives of adults and children with developmental disabilities, mental health problems, or other special needs.

There are over 100 Camphill communities in more than 20 countries across Europe, North America, Southern Africa and Asia.

Founding
The movement was founded in 1939 at Kirkton House near Aberdeen by a group that included Austrian paediatrician Karl König. It was König's view that every human being possessed a healthy inner personality that was independent of their physical characteristics, including characteristics marking developmental or mental disability, and the role of the school was to recognize, nurture and educate this essential self. The communities' philosophy, anthroposophy, states that "a perfectly formed spirit and destiny belong to each human being." The underlying principles of König's Camphill school were derived from concepts of education and social life outlined decades earlier by anthroposophist Rudolf Steiner (1861–1925).Today there are over 100 communities worldwide, in more than 20 countries, mainly in Europe, but also in North America and Southern Africa.

History
The Camphill Movement takes its name from Camphill Estate in the Milltimber area of Aberdeen, Scotland, where the Camphill pioneers moved to with their first community for children with special needs in June 1940. Camphill Estate is now a campus of Camphill School Aberdeen. There are six Camphills in the Aberdeen area.

The Camphill School Aberdeen was noted in the HMI/Care Commission report for 2007 as meeting "very good" to "excellent" standards, The school also holds Autism Accreditation from the National Autistic Society.

The Botton village received the Deputy Prime Minister's Award for Sustainable Communities in 2005; the award cited the community's dedication to the ethos of sustainability and mutual respect, as well as their concrete achievements in these areas.

See also
List of Camphill Communities

References

Further reading
 McKanan, Daniel: 'Camphill and the Future: Spirituality and disability in an evolving communal movement'.  University of California Press.  2020.  ISBN 978052034902
  Jackson, Robin: 'The Austrian provenance of the worldwide Camphill Movement' Journal of Austrian Studies, 46(4): 23–40.  2013.
  Jackson, Robin: 'Camphill communities: the agricultural impulse' Relational Child and Youth Care Practice, 26(2): 35–41. 2013.
 'Discovering Camphill: New perspectives, research and developments' Edited by Robin Jackson, Floris Books, 2011.
  Jackson, Robin: 'The origin of Camphill and the social pedagogic impulse' Educational Review, 63(1): 95–104. 2011.
 'Holistic Special Education: Camphill principles and practice' Edited by Robin Jackson, Floris Books, 2006.
The Builders of Camphill: Lives and Destinies of the Founders Edited by Friedwart Bock, Floris Books, 2004 
The Lives of Camphill: An Anthology of the Pioneers by Johannes Surkamp Floris Books (23 August 2007) 
A Candle on the Hill: Images of Camphill Life by Laurens Van der Post (Foreword), Cornelius Pietzner (Editor) Floris Books; 1st Edition (1 March 1990) 
Village Life: The Camphill Communities Edited by Carlo Pietzner, Cornelius Pietzner and Wanda Root, Simon & Schuster (Juv) (January 1987)

External links

Camphill movement website
Camphill communities in England and Wales
Camphill Scotland
Official Karl König Institute
Rudolf Steiner Archive, An Online Library

International educational organizations
Organizations established in 1939
Anthroposophy
Special education
1939 establishments in Scotland
Intentional communities in the United Kingdom